Nemch (also Romanized as Namch; also known as Namsh, Nemj, and Nemsh) is a village in Sarduiyeh Rural District, Sarduiyeh District, Jiroft County, Kerman Province, Iran. At the 2006 census, its population was 98, in 24 families.

References 

Populated places in Jiroft County